Wenzel's is a British bakery chain which operates in West & North-West  London and the surrounding Home Counties. As of 2020, the company had 72 branches. The company was founded in 1975 and is based in Watford, Hertfordshire.

References

External links
 Official website
Companies based in Watford
Bakeries of the United Kingdom
Food and drink companies established in 1975